This is a list of counter-terrorism agencies by country.

 : Anti-Terror Department, Albanian Police, RENEA, Special Operations Battalion (Albania)
 : GIS, GOSP
 : GEOF (Special Group of Federal Operations, Federal Arg Police) Falcon Commando (Comando Halcon, State Buenos Aires Police)
 : Police Tactical Groups,Tactical Assault Group and Australian Security and Intelligence Organization (ASIO)
 : EKO Cobra; Austrian Military Police; Jagdkommando
 : 1st Para-commando Battalion, Navy SWADS, SWAT (Bangladesh), CRT, RAB, ATU, SPEGUARDS, CTTC
 : State/local Police SWAT teams: BOPE, COE, GATE, COT
 : Directorate of special units (DSU) Federal Police Special Units
 : SIPA
 : Specializiran Otriad za Borba s Terorizma
 : Joint Task Force 2
 : GOPE (Police Special Operations Group, Chilean Carabineros) ERTA (Tactic Reaction Team, PDI Chilean Civil Police)
 : Snow Leopard Commando Unit, Beijing SWAT, Chongqing SWAT
 : AFEUR, GAULA, COPES
 : Lučko Anti-Terrorist Unit, RH Alfa
 : URNA National Police Rapid Response Unit or Útvar rychlého nasazení
 : Politiets Aktionsstyrke, Danish Frogman Corps
 : Anti-terrorism Special Command – Comando Especial Contra Terrorismo
 : Unit 777, Hostage Rescue Force HRF
 : K-Commando
 : Karhu-ryhmä, Utti Jaeger Regiment, Guard Jaeger Regiment
 : BRI-BAC (Paris Police Prefecture), RAID (National Police) and GIGN (National Gendarmerie)
 : Designated – Counter Terrorism Center State Security Service, Federal: MIA – Special Emergency and Crisis Center
 : Federal Police: GSG 9 and BFE / State Police: SEK and MEK, German Army: Kommando Spezialkräfte
 : Anti-Terror Division, Greek Police and Special Anti-Terrorist Unit.
 : Counter Terrorism Centre, Alert Police, Hungarian Homeland Defence Forces
 : Special Duties Unit, Airport Security Unit, Counter Terrorism Response Unit
 : Víkingasveitin
 : Rashtriya Rifles, NSG, NIA, Anti Terrorist Squad, Force One, Thunderbolt, state/local Police SWAT teams
 : Gegana (Police), Satuan 81/Gultor (Army), Detachment Bravo 90 (Air Force), Jala Mengkara Detachment (Navy)
 : NAJA (Iranian Police), NOPO (Counter-terrorism Special Force), Police Amniat (Security Police)
 : Kurdistan Region Security Council, Iraqi Special Operations Forces
 : Garda Special Detective Unit, Garda Emergency Response Unit, Garda National Surveillance Unit, Defence Forces Directorate of Military Intelligence, Defence Forces Army Ranger Wing
 : YAMAM, Sayeret Matkal, Shayetet 13, Maglan (Unit 212), Duvdevan(Unit 217), Metzada, Lotar Eilat, Shin Bet(Internal security service), Kidon, YAMAS
 : NOCS, GIS, A.P.I. Aliquota Primo Intervento, ATPI
 : Special Assault Teams and Anti-firearms squads (Prefectural police departments), Special Security Team (Japan Coast Guard), Special Forces Group (JGSDF)
 : NJSI-SIU Special Intervenation Unit
 : OMEGA
 : ARAS
 : Malaysian Armed Forces GGK, PASKAL, PASKAU, Royal Malaysian Police Pasukan Gerakan Khas, UNGERIN, Tiger Platoon, Unit Tindakan Cepat, Malaysian Coast Guard STAR APMM, Malaysian Prison Department Trup Tindakan Cepat
 : Mexican Army Special Reaction Force, Federal Police GOPES
 : Groupement de Sécurité Gendarmerie Royale
 : DSI (Dutch: Dienst Speciale Interventies, Special Interventions Service) and police special arrest teams Royal Marechaussee (Dutch: Brigade Speciale Beveiligingsopdrachten, Special Security Task Brigade) Dutch marines BBE
 : NZ Police Special Tactics Group, New Zealand Special Air Service
 : National Intelligence Agency MOPOL
 : Emergency Response Unit, FSK
 : Special Service Group, Elite Police Commandos, Counter Terrorism Department, Rangers Anti-Terrorism Wing
 : Philippine Army-Light Reaction Regiment, PNP-Special Action Force, Philippine Navy-Naval Special Operations Command, Philippine Air Force – 710th Special Operations Wing, Philippine Coast Guard-Special Operations Group and police SWAT teams
 : BOA, SPAP, ABW V Directoriate of III Departament, JW GROM
 : GOE and GIOE, Special Operations Troops Center /CTOE and Special Actions Detachment / DAE
 : Police Anti-Terrorist Unit, Selous Scouts
 : Brigada Antiteroristă, (counter-terrorist brigade)
 : Alpha Group, Vympel, OMON, SSO, Spetsnaz GRU, Vityaz, Rus, SOBR
 : SAJ, Cobras, Hawks
 : STAR
 : Special Police Unit, SEP Slovenian national police forces
 : Special Task Force (SAPS), South African Special Forces Brigade
 : 707th Special Mission Unit, Republic of Korea Navy Special Warfare Flotilla
 : 3rd Sri Lanka Army Special Forces Regiment, 3rd Sri Lanka Army Commando Regiment, Special Task Force
 : CITCO, CGI, SIGC, GEO, UEI and GEI
 : National Task Force (Nationella Insatsstyrkan) and Särskilda operationsgruppen (Special Forces)
 : Thunder Squad, NPA SOG
 : Task Force 90, Royal Thai Navy SEALs, RTMC Reconnaissance Battalion, RTAF Special Operations Regiment, Arintharat 26, Naresuan 261, Border Patrol Police Aerial Reinforcement Unit
 : Özel tim-Özel Harekat Timi (Special Team) and Maroon Berets
 : BAT and USGN
 : Counter Terrorism Command, Special Air Service, Special Boat Service
 : FBI Counter-terrorism Special Agents, FBI Hostage Rescue Team, FBI Special Weapons and Tactics Teams, (FBI SWAT) Federal Air Marshal Service, Delta Force, (US Army), Naval Special Warfare Development Group, United States Marine Corps Fleet Anti-Terrorism Security Teams (FAST) CIA Special Activities Division, (SAD) Diplomatic Security Service, Immigration and Customs Enforcement, BORTAC, state/local Police SWAT teams
 : GEO (Uruguayan Police) and Escorpión Commando Group (Uruguayan Army)

References